Sarah Kemp may refer to: 

Sarah Kemp (actress) (1937–2015), Australian actress
Sarah Kemp (golfer) (born 1985), Australian professional golfer
Sarah Kemp (figure skater) (born 1983), English pair skater
Sarah Brady (1942–2015), née Kemp, American gun control advocate

See also
Sarah Brady (1942–2015), née Kemp, American gun control advocate
Kemp, Texas, a city in Kaufman County, Texas, named for Sara Kemp, the mother of the town's first postmaster